Leo E. Strang (December 12, 1922 – April 16, 1996) was an American football coach.  He served as the head football coach at Kent State University from 1964 to 1967, compiling a record of 16–21–2. Strang died at the age of 73  on April 16, 1996 in Akron, Ohio.

Head coaching record

College

References

External links
 

1922 births
1996 deaths
Kent State Golden Flashes football coaches
High school football coaches in Ohio
People from Ashland, Ohio
Coaches of American football from Ohio